The Guildford Four and Maguire Seven were the collective names of two groups whose convictions in English courts in 1975 and 1976 for the Guildford pub bombings of 5 October 1974 were eventually quashed after long campaigns for justice. The Guildford Four were wrongly convicted of bombings carried out by the Provisional Irish Republican Army (IRA); the Maguire Seven were wrongly convicted of handling explosives found during the investigation into the bombings. Both groups' convictions were eventually declared "unsafe and unsatisfactory" and reversed in 1989 and 1991 respectively after they had served up to 15–16 years in prison. Along with the Maguires and the Guildford Four, a number of other people faced charges relating to the bombings, six of them charged with murder, but these charges were dropped. No one else was charged with the bombings, or supplying the material; three police officers were charged with conspiracy to pervert the course of justice, but found not guilty.

Guildford Four
The Guildford Four were charged with direct involvement with the IRA attacks. They were:

After their arrest, all four defendants confessed to the bombing under intense coercion by the police.
These statements were later retracted but remained the basis of the case against them. They would later be alleged to be the result of coercion by the police, ranging from intimidation to torture—including threats against family members—as well as the effects of drug withdrawal.
Conlon wrote in his autobiography that a key factor in his purportedly coerced confession was the fact that strengthened anti-terrorism laws passed in the early 1970s allowed the police to hold suspects without charges for up to a week, rather than the previous limit of 48 hours and that he might have been able to withstand the treatment he had received had the original time limit been in effect.

The four were convicted on 22 October 1975 for murder and other charges and sentenced to life imprisonment – mandatory for adults convicted of murder. Richardson, a minor at the time of the bombings, received an indeterminate "at Her Majesty's pleasure" sentence for murder and a life sentence for conspiracy. Justice Lord John Donaldson, who also presided over the Maguire Seven trial, expressed regret that the Four had not been charged with treason, which still had a mandatory death penalty. Although no hangings had been carried out in the UK since 1964, treason still carried the death penalty until 1998. The normal practice was for judges to be consulted by the Home Secretary when considering release from a life sentence, rather than giving a tariff at trial but the judge, believing he might be dead by the time they were released, recommended 30 years for Conlon, 35 for Armstrong and until "great age" for Hill.

The Guildford Four did not "fit the bill" of IRA involvement according to the way they lived. Paddy Armstrong and Carole Richardson, an Englishwoman, lived in a squat and were involved with drugs and petty crime. Conlon asserted at several points in his autobiography that the IRA would not have taken him due to his record for shoplifting and other petty crimes, and that he had been expelled from Fianna Éireann, an Irish republican youth organisation with strong ties to the Provisional IRA.

Maguire Seven

The Maguire Seven were charged with possessing nitroglycerine allegedly passed to the IRA to make bombs after the police raided the West Kilburn house of Anne Maguire (Conlon’s aunt) on 3 December 1974.

They were tried and convicted on 4 March 1976 and received the following sentences:

Giuseppe Conlon had travelled from Belfast to help his son, Gerry Conlon, in the Guildford Four trial. Conlon, who had troubles with his lungs for many years, died in prison in January 1980, while the other six served their sentences and were released.

Appeals
The Guildford Four and the Maguire Seven sought leave to appeal their convictions immediately and were refused. Despite this, a growing body of disparate groups pressed for a re-examination of the case.

In February 1977, during the trial of the Balcombe Street ASU, the four IRA men instructed their lawyers to "draw attention to the fact that four totally innocent people were serving massive sentences", referring to the Guildford Four.
Despite claims to the police that they were responsible they were never charged with these offences and the Guildford Four remained in prison for another twelve years.

The Guildford Four tried to obtain from the Home Secretary a reference to the Court of Appeal under Section 17 of the Criminal Appeal Act 1968 (later repealed), but were unsuccessful. In 1987, the Home Office issued a memorandum recognising that it was unlikely they were terrorists, but that this would not be sufficient evidence for appeal.

Campaigns
Following the failure of the 1977 court appeal, a number of 'lone voices' publicly questioned the conviction; among them David Martin in The Leveller, Gavin Esler and Chris Mullin in the New Statesman and David McKittrick in the Belfast Telegraph. On 26 February 1980, BBC One Northern Ireland aired Spotlight: Giuseppe Conlon and the Bomb Factory, which contained an interview by Patrick Maguire and the BBC's Gavin Esler.

Quashing of the Guildford Four verdict

In 1989, detectives from Avon and Somerset Constabulary, investigating the handling of the case, found significant pieces of evidence in relation to Surrey Police's handling of the Guildford Four and their statements. Typed notes from Patrick Armstrong's police interviews had been extensively edited. Deletions and additions had been made and the notes had been rearranged. The notes and their amendments were consistent with hand-written and typed notes presented at the trial, which suggested that the hand-written notes were made after the interviews had been conducted. The notes presented had been described in court as contemporaneous records. Manuscript notes relating to an interview with Hill showed that Hill's fifth statement was taken in breach of Judges' Rules and may well have been inadmissible as evidence. The information was not made available to the DPP or the prosecution and the officers involved had denied under oath that such an interview had happened. Detention records were inconsistent with the times and durations of the claimed interviews, as reported by the Surrey police.

An appeal was already under way on the basis of other evidence. Lord Gifford represented Paul Hill, and others were represented by human rights solicitor, Gareth Peirce. The appeal hearing had been adjourned to January 1990 at the request of the Guildford Four but once the findings of the Somerset and Avon report were available, the hearing was resumed, with the Crown stating that it did not wish to support the convictions. The Lord Chief Justice, Lord Lane, concluded that, regardless of the impact of the content of the material discovered by Avon and Somerset, or the alibis or additional evidence the appellants wished to introduce, the level of duplicity meant that all the police evidence was suspect, and the case for the prosecution was unsafe.

Lane remarked

The Four were released on 19 October 1989, after having their convictions quashed. Paul Hill had also been convicted of the murder of a British soldier, Brian Shaw, based on his confession while in the custody of Surrey Police. This did not fall under the ambit of the Lane appeal, but he was released on bail pending his appeal against this conviction. In 1994, Her Majesty's Court of Appeal in Belfast quashed Hill's conviction for Shaw's murder.

Quashing of the Maguire verdicts
On 12 July 1990, the Home Secretary, David Waddington, published the Interim Report on the Maguire Case: The Inquiry into the circumstances surrounding the convictions arising out of the bomb attacks in Guildford and Woolwich in 1974, which criticised the trial judge, Mr Justice Donaldson and unearthed improprieties in the handling of scientific evidence, declared the convictions unsound and recommended referral back to the Court of Appeal.
The report "strongly criticise[d] the decision by the prosecution at the Guildford Four's trial not to disclose to the defence a statement supporting Mr Conlon's alibi." The convictions of the Maguire Seven were quashed in 1991.

Aftermath
Neither the bombings nor the wrongful imprisonment resulted in convictions. The bombings were most likely the work of the Balcombe Street ASU, who claimed responsibility. They were already serving life sentences, but were released under the terms of the Good Friday Agreement. Three British police officers — Thomas Style, John Donaldson and Vernon Attwell — were charged with conspiracy to pervert the course of justice, but each was found not guilty.

On 9 February 2005, Tony Blair, the Prime Minister of the United Kingdom, issued an apology to the families of the eleven people imprisoned for the bombings in Guildford and Woolwich and those related to those who were still alive. He said, in part, "I am very sorry that they were subject to such an ordeal and injustice... they deserve to be completely and publicly exonerated."

Anne Maguire was awarded a Benemerenti medal by the Roman Catholic Church for her "remarkable ability to forgive" and her community work. In 1993, Paul Hill married Courtney Kennedy, a daughter of assassinated American senator Robert F. Kennedy and a niece of assassinated president John F. Kennedy. They had a daughter in 1997 named Saoirse. Paul had a daughter in a previous relationship named Cara with Gina Tohill in 1975. Paul and Courtney legally separated in 2006. Their daughter, Saoirse Kennedy Hill, died in 2019 at the age of 22.

Hill had a televised meeting with the brother of murdered soldier Brian Shaw, who continued to accuse him. He travelled to Colombia to attend the trial of the Colombia Three.

Gerry Conlon's autobiography Proved Innocent was adapted into the film In the Name of the Father, with actor Daniel Day-Lewis portraying Conlon. The film depicts Conlon's attempt to rebuild his shattered relationship with his father but is partly fictional, Conlon never shared a cell with his father. He is reported to have settled with the government for a final payment of compensation in the region of £500,000. Conlon gave support to Tommy Sheridan in relation to the charges brought against him.

Sarah Conlon, who had spent 16 years campaigning to have the names of her husband and son cleared and helped secure the apology, died on 20 July 2008.

Paddy Armstrong had problems with drinking and gambling. He eventually married and moved to Dublin. Carole Richardson married and had a daughter soon after her release. She kept out of the public eye and died in 2012 aged 55.

The autobiography of the youngest member of the Maguire Seven, Patrick Maguire, My Father's Watch: The Story of a Child Prisoner in 70s Britain was released in May 2008. It tells his story before, during and after his imprisonment and details its impact on his life and those of his family.

Gerry Conlon later joined a campaign to free the "Craigavon Two", Brendan McConville and John Paul Wootton, convicted of the murder of a police officer in Northern Ireland. 

Conlon died at home in Belfast on 21 June 2014. His family issued a statement:  "He brought life, love, intelligence, wit and strength to our family through its darkest hours. He helped us to survive what we were not meant to survive. We recognise that what he achieved by fighting for justice for us had a far, far greater importance – it forced the world's closed eyes to be opened to injustice; it forced unimaginable wickedness to be acknowledged; we believe it changed the course of history".

Sir John Donaldson went on to an illustrious judicial career and became Master of the Rolls, Head of the Civil Division of the Court of Appeal. The appeal case itself for R v Maguire 1981, is now the leading case for disclosure to the defence. In November 2018 the BBC broadcast a documentary A Great British Injustice: The Maguire Story, with the involvement of surviving members of the Maguire family.

In popular culture

 In March 1991 Paul Hill appeared on the Channel 4 discussion programme After Dark with, among others, Patrick Cosgrave, J. P. Donleavy, David Norris, Emily O'Reilly and Francis Stuart.
 In May 1994 Paul Hill gave a half-hour Opinions lecture televised on Channel 4 and subsequently published in The Independent as "Prisoners on the Outside".
 The film In the Name of the Father starring Daniel Day-Lewis was based on the story of the Guildford Four. The film was nominated for seven Academy Awards.
 The Guildford Four are mentioned in the track "Fifty in Five" from the Australian hip-hop album State of the Art which compiles major events of the past fifty years condensed into a five-minute song.
 The song "The Guildford Four" on the album "Himself" by Northern Irish singer-songwriter Andy White tells the story of their wrongful conviction. It was released in 1990 on Cooking Vinyl.

See also
 Good Friday Agreement
 Birmingham Six
 Maamtrasna trial

References

External links
 Life for a life sentences to warn the IRA – A report on the sentencing phase of the original trial, The Guardian, 23 October 1975
 Miscarriages of justice
 Summary of the cases from the BBC
 Justice:Denied's review of the book and movie version of In the Name of the Father
 Background to the Irish cases

People imprisoned during the Northern Ireland conflict
1974 in England
1974 in Northern Ireland
1975 in England
1975 in British law
1975 in Northern Ireland
1976 in England
1976 in British law
1976 in Northern Ireland
1989 in England
1989 in British law
1989 in Northern Ireland
1991 in England
1991 in British law
1991 in Northern Ireland
Guildford
London Borough of Brent
History of London
Politics of London
History of Surrey
Politics of Surrey
Overturned convictions in England
Quantified groups of defendants
Court of Appeal (England and Wales) cases
False confessions
Recipients of the Benemerenti medal
People wrongfully convicted of murder